Bootleg is the debut album by Tempest. At the time, they did not have a fiddle player, and performed as a four-piece.

Track listing
 Heather on the Moor (Traditional/Tempest)
 Soldier Song (Wullenjohn)
 Handsome Molly (Traditional/Tempest)
 Wild Rover (Wullenjohn/Traditional)
 Desert Eyes (Butler)
 Captain Morgan (Sorbye)
 Same Side of the Fence (Sorbye/Butler)
 Dance of the Third Leg (Wullenjohn)
 Heart of Mine (Sorbye)
 Man Without a Name (Butler)

Personnel
 Lief Sorbye – mandolin, vocals
 Rob Wullenjohn – guitar
 Adolfo Lazo – drums
 Ian Butler – bass
 Danny Carnahan - fiddle
 Album produced by Tempest with Doug Dayson and John Altman.
 Recorded at The Music Annex and Dave Wellhausen Studios, San Francisco, California.
 Engineered by John Altmann and Doug Dayson.
 Mastered by George Horn at Fantasy Studios, Berkeley, California.
 Released by Heyday Records.

References

1991 albums
Tempest (band) albums